Piera Degli Esposti (12 March 1938 – 14 August 2021) was an Italian actress. She appeared in more than 70 films and television shows from 1966 to 2020. In 2009, she won the David di Donatello for Best Supporting Actress for her role of Mrs. Enea in Il Divo.

Selected filmography

 Ghosts – Italian Style (1968)
 Sweet Dreams (1981)
 A Joke of Destiny (1983)
 The Future Is Woman (1984)
 The Malady of Love (1986)
 Don Bosco (1988)
 The Tenth One in Hiding (1989)
 The Betrothed (1989)
 The Worker and the Hairdresser (1989)
 My Mother's Smile (2002)
 The Unknown Woman (2006)
 Il Divo (2008)
 Giulia Doesn't Date at Night (2009)
 Parents and Children: Shake Well Before Using (2010)
 David's Birthday (2010)
 Lost Kisses (2010)
 A Holy Venetian Family (2015)
 Chlorine (2015)
 Somewhere Amazing (2015)
 Banat (The Journey) (2015)

References

External links

1938 births
2021 deaths
Actors from Bologna
Italian film actresses
David di Donatello winners
20th-century Italian actresses
21st-century Italian actresses